Nguyễn Đình Cương (born 1982 in Yên Mô, Ninh Bình) is a middle-distance runner who specializes in the 800 metres. He competed at the 2008 Olympic 800 metres.

Competition record

References

External links
 

1982 births
Living people
People from Ninh Bình province
Vietnamese male sprinters
Vietnamese male middle-distance runners
Olympic athletes of Vietnam
Athletes (track and field) at the 2008 Summer Olympics
Athletes (track and field) at the 2006 Asian Games
Athletes (track and field) at the 2010 Asian Games
Southeast Asian Games medalists in athletics
Southeast Asian Games gold medalists for Vietnam
Southeast Asian Games silver medalists for Vietnam
Southeast Asian Games bronze medalists for Vietnam
Competitors at the 2003 Southeast Asian Games
Competitors at the 2007 Southeast Asian Games
Competitors at the 2009 Southeast Asian Games
Competitors at the 2011 Southeast Asian Games
Asian Games competitors for Vietnam
20th-century Vietnamese people
21st-century Vietnamese people